15 rating refers to a type of age-based content rating that applies to media entertainment, such as films, television shows and computer games. The following articles document the rating across a range of countries and mediums:

Classification organizations
 Australian Classification Board (MA15+ and M)
 British Board of Film Classification (15)
 Common Sense Media (15+)
 Computer Entertainment Rating Organization (C – 15 equivalent)
 Dirección General de Radio, Televisión y Cinematografía (B-15)
 Eirin (R15+)
 Irish Film Classification Office (15 and 15A)
 Korea Media Rating Board (15)
 National Bureau of Classification (NBC) (15+)
 Norwegian Media Authority (15)
 Office of Film and Literature Classification (New Zealand) (R15)

Systems
 Motion picture content rating system, a range of classification systems for films that commonly use the age 15 as part of its regulatory criteria
 Television content rating system, a range of classification systems for television broadcasts that commonly use the age 15 as part of its regulatory criteria
 Video game content rating system, a range of classification systems for video games that commonly use the age 15 as part of its regulatory criteria
 Mobile software content rating system, a range of classification systems for mobile software that commonly use the age 15 as part of its regulatory criteria